Battlements Nunatak is a large nunatak near the head of Mawson Glacier, about  northwest of the Allan Hills. It is mostly ice free and has a number of small peaks running in a line west from the main peak. It was discovered and named by the New Zealand party (1957–58) of the Commonwealth Trans-Antarctic Expedition; the name describes the steep rock peaks of the nunatak.

References 

Nunataks of Oates Land